Ramon Machado de Macedo (born 4 April 1991) is a Brazilian professional footballer who plays as a striker for Gabala in the Azerbaijan Premier League.

Career
On 1 September 2021, Ramon signed a one-year contract with Neftçi, with Neftçi confirming his departure on 27 June 2022. On 30 July 2022, fellow Azerbaijan Premier League club Gabala announced the signing of Ramon on a one-year contract.

References

External links
 
 
 Ramon at ZeroZero

1991 births
Living people
Brazilian footballers
Association football forwards
2. Bundesliga players
Campeonato Brasileiro Série B players
Campeonato Brasileiro Série C players
Campeonato Brasileiro Série D players
SSV Jahn Regensburg players
Clube Esportivo Bento Gonçalves players
Clube Esportivo Lajeadense players
Futebol Clube Santa Cruz players
Boa Esporte Clube players
Grêmio Esportivo Brasil players
Associação Atlética Ponte Preta players
Esporte Clube Juventude players
Vila Nova Futebol Clube players
Ituano FC players
Paraná Clube players
Esporte Clube Santo André players
Botafogo Futebol Clube (PB) players